Jan of Tarnów (1367–1433) was a Polish nobleman (szlachcic).

Jan was owner of Tarnów and Wielowieś estates. He became dean of Kraków from September 27, 1398 to November 12, 1409 and voivode of Kraków Voivodeship in 1409.

Like his brother Spytek, Jan commanded one of the Leliwa clan banners at the Battle of Grunwald in 1410.

1367 births
1433 deaths
14th-century Polish nobility
People in the Battle of Grunwald
Jan z Tarnowa 1367
15th-century Polish nobility